Jan Quast (born 9 January 1970 in Rostock) is a German former boxer who competed in the light flyweight (– 48 kg) division during the late 1980s, early 1990s.

Boxing career
As a junior he won a bronze medal at the 1987 World Junior Championships in Havana.

He represented his native country at the 1992 Summer Olympics in Barcelona, where he won the bronze medal. In the semifinals he was stopped by Bulgaria's eventual runner-up Daniel Petrov. Quast also won the bronze medal at the 1989 European Amateur Boxing Championships in Athens and was a participant in the next three Championships in 1991 in Gothenburg, 1993 in Bursa and in 1996 in Vejle. He also participated in five World Championships in 1989 in Moscow, 1991 in Sydney, 1993 in Tampere, 1995 in Berlin and 1997 in Budapest.

He won the Chemistry Cup international tournament in Halle in 1992, 1993, 1995 and 1996.

Olympic results 
Defeated Mohamed Zbir (Morocco) 5-0
Defeated Pramuansak Phosuwan (Thailand) 11-2
Defeated Valentin Barbu (Romania) 15-7
Lost to Daniel Petrov (Bulgaria) 9-15

References

 databaseOlympics.com
 Profile

1970 births
Living people
Flyweight boxers
Boxers at the 1992 Summer Olympics
Olympic boxers of Germany
Olympic bronze medalists for Germany
Sportspeople from Rostock
Olympic medalists in boxing
German male boxers
Medalists at the 1992 Summer Olympics